Katarzyna Krasowska (born 28 September  1969) is a former Polish female badminton player. She competed at the Olympics representing Poland on 3 occasions (1992, 1996 and 2000).

Krasowska has also been a Polish national badminton champion for nine times as she won the Polish National Badminton Championships in 1991, 1992, 1993, 1994, 1995, 1996, 1997, 1998 and in 2000.

References

External links 
Profile at BWF
 Profile at BWF tournament software
Profile in Polish

1969 births
Living people
Polish female badminton players
Olympic badminton players of Poland
Badminton players at the 1992 Summer Olympics
Badminton players at the 1996 Summer Olympics
Badminton players at the 2000 Summer Olympics
Sportspeople from Opole